was a village located in Nakauonuma District, Niigata Prefecture, Japan.

As of 2003, the village had an estimated population of 6,171 and a density of 47.85 persons per km². The total area was 128.97 km².

On April 1, 2005, Nakasato, along with the towns of Matsudai and Matsunoyama (both from Higashikubiki District), and the town of Kawanishi (also from Nakauonuma District), was merged into the expanded city of Tōkamachi.

Transportation

Railway
 JR East - Iiyama Line

Highway

Local attractions
Nakasato is one of the sites of the Echigo-Tsumari Art Triennial.

 Kiyotsu Gorge (Kiyotsukyo, :ja:清津峡)

See also
Tōkamachi

External links
Tokamachi Tourist Association 
Echigo-Tsumari Art Field 

Dissolved municipalities of Niigata Prefecture
Tōkamachi, Niigata